The 2000 Canoe Sprint European Championships were held in Poznań, Poland.

Medal overview

Men

Women

Medal table

References

External links
 European Canoe Association

Canoe Sprint European Championships
2000 in Polish sport
2000 in canoeing
Canoeing and kayaking competitions in Poland
International sports competitions hosted by Poland